A banishment room (also known as a chasing-out-room and a boredom room) is a modern employee exit management strategy whereby employees are transferred to another department where they are assigned meaningless work until they become disheartened and resign.  Since the resignation is voluntary, the employee would not be eligible for certain benefits. The legality and ethicality of the practice is questionable and may be construed as constructive dismissal in some regions.

The practice, which is not officially acknowledged, is common in Japan which has strong labor laws and a tradition of permanent employment. In France, the expression "mise au placard" describes this due to the difficulty of firing employees (outside of mergers)

See also
 Boreout
 Reassignment center – External facilities formerly used by the New York City Department of Education where teachers were sent pending disciplinary processes

References

Termination of employment
Labour law
Ethically disputed working conditions
Rooms